G.G. Green's Block is located in Woodbury, Gloucester County, New Jersey, United States. The building was built in 1880 and was added to the National Register of Historic Places on July 25, 2001.

Earthquake damage
Following the 2011 Virginia earthquake the vacant building and attached structures, which were also vacant, were ruled structurally unsafe. The sidewalk in front of the building as well as the adjoining streets were fenced off by the City of Woodbury. Due to several liens placed on the building and against the owner, the decision on what to do with the building fell to the City. Estimates to demolish the building ranged as high as $950,000. Woodbury City reached out to developers to take control of the property. A deal was struck with the RPM Development Group to repair the building, turn the ground floor into retail space, and construct age restricted apartments on the upper floors.

See also
National Register of Historic Places listings in Gloucester County, New Jersey

References

Commercial buildings on the National Register of Historic Places in New Jersey
Commercial buildings completed in 1880
Buildings and structures in Gloucester County, New Jersey
National Register of Historic Places in Gloucester County, New Jersey
Woodbury, New Jersey
1880 establishments in New Jersey
New Jersey Register of Historic Places